Reynoldsville may refer to:

 Reynoldsville, Georgia, an unincorporated community in Seminole County, Georgia
 Reynoldsville, Illinois
 Reynoldsville, New York
 Reynoldsville, Pennsylvania
 Reynoldsville, West Virginia

es:Reynoldsville